Mark Titchner (born 1973) is an English artist, and 2006 nominee for the Turner Prize. He lives and works in London.  Focusing on an exploration of words and language, in recent years much of his production has been based in the public realm both in the UK and internationally. These public works have often been created from extended group activities.

Early life
Titchner was born in Luton and grew up in the adjacent town of Dunstable.  He graduated from Central Saint Martins College of Art and Design, London, in 1995.

Career
In 2006 Titchner was nominated for the Turner Prize for a solo show at the Arnolfini, Bristol, in which he displayed the sculptural installation "How To Change Behaviour (Tiny Masters Of The World Come Out)". The Tate Gallery described his work in the following manner:
... hybrid installations furthered his exploration into systems of belief. Working across a wide range of media, including light boxes and extraordinary hand-carved contraptions, his work continues to interweave a vast array of references from heavy metal lyrics to philosophy.

In 2007 he was included in the 52nd Venice Biennale exhibiting in Ukraine's Pavilion, A Poem about an Inland Sea. A solo exhibition Run, Black River, Run followed at BALTIC, Gateshead early in 2008. His book WHY AND WHY NOT was published by Bookworks in 2004.

In 2003, he had a solo show Be Angry but Don't Stop Breathing as part of the Art Now series at Tate Britain.<ref>"Art Now: Be Angry but Don't Stop Breathing"], tate.org.uk; accessed 16 May 2006.</ref>

In 2011, he had a solo show "Be True to Your Oblivion" at The New Art Gallery Walsall. This exhibition formed part of Capsule's Home of Metal project, a huge cultural project to establish Birmingham and the Black Country as the home of heavy metal. He was the Art Gallery of Ontario's Artist-in-Residence from September to October 2012. He is regularly working in public (e.g. Blackpool in 2016, Manchester in 2017, Royal Bethlem Hospital London in 2019, Colchester in 2020) where his works reach a broad audience and attention. 

His work is held in the permanent collections of The Arts Council, British Council, South London Gallery, the United Kingdom Government Art Collection and the Tate Gallery.

ExhibitionsMark Titchner (2014) CGP and Dilston Grove, LondonBe true to your Oblivion (2011) New Art Gallery WalsallRun, Black River, Run (2008) Baltic, GatesheadWe Were Thinking of Evolving (2003), Vilma Gold, LondonBag Lady! (2003), Cell Project Space, LondonElectric Earth (2003), International British Council touring showThe Galleries Show (2002), Royal Academy, LondonPlaying amongst the Ruins (2001), Royal College of Art, LondonCity Racing (A Partial History) (2001), ICA, London

Selected Public works[https://futurecity.co.uk/portfolio/me-here-now/ Me. Here. Now. (2018) London Bridge Station - Stainer Street Art commission What I want more than anything else, (2017) Various venues Hull, Wigan, Leigh & Burnley. Commissioned by FACTBeacon, (2016) The Hat Factory, LutonLive the life that you imagine, (2015) One St Peters Square, ManchesterOur work is today together'', (2015 ) Sceaux Gardens Estate, London (Commissioned by South London Gallery)

See also
Book Works
Big 4 (statue)

References

External links
Artists Website
Vilma Gold Gallery website 
Peres Projects website
Profile, Independent.co.uk 
Interview, Guardian.co.uk

1973 births
Living people
Alumni of Central Saint Martins
English contemporary artists
People from Luton
Artists from London
Date of birth missing (living people)